Linn Township is a township in Dallas County, Iowa, USA.  As of the 2000 census, its population was 584.

Geography
According to the USGS, it contains three cemeteries: East Linn, Harper and West Linn.

The Middle Raccoon River and the streams of Cass Creek and Mosquito Creek run through this township.

References
 USGS Geographic Names Information System (GNIS)

External links
 US-Counties.com
 City-Data.com

Townships in Dallas County, Iowa
Townships in Iowa